Prince Nana Takyi (born March 16, 1983, in Kumasi) is a Danish-Ghanaian former football player in the striker position. He played for Akademisk Boldklub in the Danish Superliga championship, and played professionally for a number of Danish clubs in the Danish 1st Division, and was named 2008 Best African Footballer in Denmark. He ended his career in February 2010 due to injuries. Nana received a Danish citizenship in February 2008.

Nana started his senior career in Danish football, playing in Kjøbenhavns Boldklub (KB), the reserve team of multiple Danish champions F.C. Copenhagen. He later joined Akademisk Boldklub (AB), playing in the Danish Superliga championship. He made his Superliga debut in a 2–1 win against BK Frem on August 31, 2003. In February 2004, Nana was poised to replace departing strikers Heine Fernandez and Abdul Sule in the AB starting line-up, but he suffered a ruptured Achilles tendon in April 2004. He only played that one game, as AB ended in last place of the 2003-04 Danish Superliga season and was relegated to the Danish 1st Division.

He stayed with AB in the 1st Division, and scored a hat-trick for AB in a 4–1 win against BK Frem on October 1, 2006. AB coach Christian Andersen emphasized Nana as the profile of the AB team in March 2007, likening him to Adriano Leite Ribeiro. Nana suffered a knee injury in April 2007, and was out for the rest of the year. He never fully recovered, and Nana left AB in July 2008, and signed with Køge BK. In November 2008, Nana received the 2008 Best African Footballer in Denmark award. After half a year at Køge, Nana signed with Hellerup IK in January 2009. He moved to Boldklubben Frem in July 2009, to play under his former coach Christian Andersen. Nana suffered further injuries, and decided to end his career in February 2010.

Honours 
2008: Best African Footballer in Denmark

References

External links
 Prince Nana Boldklubben Frem profile and record 

Living people
1983 births
Danish men's footballers
Danish people of Ghanaian descent
Ghanaian footballers
Kjøbenhavns Boldklub players
Akademisk Boldklub players
Køge Boldklub players
Hellerup IK players
Boldklubben Frem players
Odense Boldklub players
Ghanaian expatriate sportspeople in Denmark
Expatriate men's footballers in Denmark
Footballers from Kumasi
Association football forwards
University of Ghana alumni